The play-off first legs were played on 8 October 2010, while the second legs were played on 12 October 2010. Winners of play-off round and host nation Denmark will participate in the championship next year.

Matches
The draw took place on 10 September 2010 in Herning, Denmark. Fourteen teams were drawn into seven two-legged ties.  The matches between Iceland and Scotland were moved back a day to avoid a fixture clash with full internationals.

|}

First leg

Second leg

Switzerland won 5–2 on aggregate

Iceland won 4–2 on aggregate

England won 2–1 on aggregate

Spain won 5–1 on aggregate

Belarus won 3–2 on aggregate

Czech Republic won 5–0 on aggregate

3–3 on aggregate, Ukraine won on away goals rule.

References

play-offs
Play
UEFA European Under-21 Championship qualification play-offs